Great Great Great is a Canadian drama film, directed by Adam Garnet Jones and released in 2017. The film stars Sarah Kolasky as Lauren, a woman who begins having an affair when she decides that her five-year relationship with Tom (Dan Beirne) is unsatisfying and she wants something more.

The film premiered at the Canadian Filmmakers' Festival in 2017, where it won the festival's awards for Best Feature Film, Best Screenplay and Best Performance. It was subsequently picked up for commercial distribution by A71 Entertainment.

At the 6th Canadian Screen Awards in 2018, Jones and Kolasky received a nomination for Best Original Screenplay.

Cast 

 Dan Beirne as Tom Anderson
 Richard Clarkin as David Paolini
 Sarah Kolasky as Lauren Frank

References

External links
 

2017 films
2017 drama films
Canadian drama films
English-language Canadian films
Films directed by Adam Garnet Jones
Films about infidelity
2010s English-language films
2010s Canadian films
English-language drama films